Blood Ties is a 2013 crime thriller film directed by Guillaume Canet and starring Clive Owen, Billy Crudup, Marion Cotillard, Mila Kunis and Matthias Schoenaerts. It is a remake of the 2008 French thriller film Les liens du sang by Jacques Maillot, an adaptation of the French novel Deux frères: flic & truand by Bruno and Michel Papet. The screenplay was written by Canet and James Gray. The film was selected to be screened out of competition at the 2013 Cannes Film Festival. The film is a co-production between France and the United States. It was released in France by Mars Distribution on October 30, 2013, and by Roadside Attractions in the United States on March 21, 2014.

Plot
In 1974, Chris Pierzynski is released from prison after serving twelve years for murdering a rapist and killer he caught in the act. His ex-wife Monica is a drug-addicted prostitute. They have a son and a daughter. Chris tries to go straight with his new girlfriend Natalie, but is betrayed and sabotaged in his pursuit of a legitimate business venture. Returning to his criminal ways puts him in direct conflict with his brother Frank, who happens to be a New York City cop. Their sister Marie, and their sick father Leon, want Chris and Frank to just get along with each other.

When arresting Anthony Scarfo at his house, Frank happens to meet his ex-girlfriend Vanessa again. Though Vanessa is now married to Anthony and has a daughter by him, Frank and Vanessa get back together again anyway, and she decides to divorce Anthony. But in the meantime, Frank becomes conflicted over allowing Chris to flee the scene of a felony murder. After Anthony is released from police custody, his first act is to seek revenge against Frank for destroying his home life. Chris uncovers the plot and must decide between saving his own skin and stopping Anthony in his tracks.

Cast

Production
The film is a co-production between France and the United States. It was produced by the French companies Les Productions du Trésor, LGM Cinéma, Chi-Fou-Mi Productions, France 2 Cinéma, Caneo Films, Mars Films, and Wild Bunch International along with the American companies Worldview Entertainment and Le Grisbi Productions.

Filming started on May 3, 2012 in Woodmere, New York. The first pictures of the set surfaced on May 12, 2012. Lionsgate UK acquired the UK rights.

Casting
On March 15, 2012, it was announced that Clive Owen and Billy Crudup would star in Blood Ties, playing two brothers with Mila Kunis and Zoe Saldana as love interests and Marion Cotillard as ex-lover. Austin Williams played a younger version of Owen's character.

Release

Blood Ties screened out of competition at the 2013 Cannes Film Festival. It was released in France on October 30, 2013. A trimmed version, running 127 minutes, was released in the United States on March 21, 2014.

Home media
The 127-minute version was released on DVD in June 2014.

Reception

Box office
In the United States it was released by Roadside Attractions and made $42,472 over two weekends in limited release. In France, it had only 238,823 entries, although it was screened in more than 400 theaters in the country. Blood Ties grossed $2.5 million worldwide.

Critical response
Blood Ties received mixed reviews. On review aggregate website Rotten Tomatoes, the film holds an approval rate of 52%, based on 56 reviews, with an average score of 5.61/10. The website's critics consensus reads: "Blood Ties boasts a fine cast and palpable period detail, but ultimately fails to do much of anything new with its formulaic story." Metacritic gave the film a rating of 45/100 (indicating "mixed or average"), based on reviews from 16 critics.

Todd McCarthy of The Hollywood Reporter criticized the film, saying: "The impressive cast makes this French-financed New York 1974-set production watchable but it's too inert to catch on with critics or audiences." Xan Brooks of The Guardian gave the film 3 out of 5 stars. Matt Barone of Complex gave the film 3 out of 10 stars. Fionnuala Halligan of Screen International called it "Heat meets Mesrine via Cain and Abel". Ryland Aldrich of Twitch Film praised the production. "From the wonderfully decorated exteriors loaded with the cars of the era to the record players spinning classic hits, 1970s New York absolutely comes alive", he said.

References

External links
 
 

2013 films
2013 crime thriller films
2010s English-language films
American crime thriller films
American remakes of French films
Crime film remakes
Crime films based on actual events
English-language French films
Films about brothers
Films about dysfunctional families
Films about murderers
Films about the New York City Police Department
Films based on adaptations
Films based on French novels
Films directed by Guillaume Canet
Films set in 1974
Films set in 1975
French films set in New York City
Films shot in New York City
Films with screenplays by James Gray
French crime thriller films
Roadside Attractions films
Thriller film remakes
Thriller films based on actual events
Worldview Entertainment films
2010s American films
2010s French films
Foreign films set in the United States